Sonia María O'Neill Caroli (born 19 August 1994) is a Canadian-born Venezuelan footballer who plays for German Frauen-Bundesliga club 1. FFC Turbine Potsdam and the Venezuela women's national team. She also holds Italian citizenship.

College career
O'Neill attended the Niagara University and University of North Florida, both in the United States.

Club career
In May 2017, O'Neill joined Swedish Elitettan club Husqvarna FF, scoring two goals in her first match. Shortly after, she signed for Fleury.

International career
O'Neill was eligible to play for Canada, Venezuela, or Italy at international level. In late October 2019, she was called up by Venezuela.

References

1994 births
Living people
People with acquired Venezuelan citizenship
Venezuelan women's footballers
Women's association football midfielders
Niagara Purple Eagles women's soccer players
North Florida Ospreys women's soccer players
FC Fleury 91 (women) players
ŽNK Split players
Rangers W.F.C. players
1. FFC Turbine Potsdam players
Croatian Women's First Football League players
Scottish Women's Premier League players
Venezuela women's international footballers
Venezuelan expatriate women's footballers
Venezuelan expatriate sportspeople in the United States
Expatriate women's soccer players in the United States
Venezuelan expatriate sportspeople in Sweden
Expatriate women's footballers in Sweden
Venezuelan expatriate sportspeople in Croatia
Expatriate women's footballers in Croatia
Venezuelan expatriate sportspeople in France
Expatriate women's footballers in France
Venezuelan expatriate sportspeople in Scotland
Expatriate women's footballers in Scotland
Venezuelan expatriate sportspeople in Germany
Expatriate women's footballers in Germany
Venezuelan people of Canadian descent
Sportspeople of Canadian descent
Venezuelan people of Irish descent
Venezuelan people of Italian descent
Soccer players from Toronto
Canadian expatriate women's soccer players
Canadian expatriate sportspeople in the United States
Canadian expatriate sportspeople in Sweden
Canadian expatriate sportspeople in Croatia
Canadian expatriate sportspeople in France
Canadian expatriate sportspeople in Scotland
Canadian expatriate sportspeople in Germany
Canadian sportspeople of Irish descent
Canadian sportspeople of Italian descent
Canadian people of Venezuelan descent
Sportspeople of Venezuelan descent
Citizens of Italy through descent
Italian women's footballers
Roma Calcio Femminile players
A.S.D. Pink Sport Time players
Serie A (women's football) players
Italian expatriate women's footballers
Italian expatriate sportspeople in the United States
Italian expatriate sportspeople in Sweden
Italian expatriate sportspeople in Croatia
Italian expatriate sportspeople in France
Italian expatriate sportspeople in Scotland
Italian expatriate sportspeople in Germany
Italian people of Canadian descent
Italian people of Irish descent
Italian people of Venezuelan descent